The forest thrush (Turdus lherminieri) is a species of bird in the family Turdidae. It was historically the sole species within the genus Cichlherminia, however the AOU reclassified the species to the genus Turdus in 2009.

This is a medium-sized thrush at 25–27 cm long and weighing 100–110 g. Like many thrushes, the forest thrush has brown upperparts with pale underparts showing a scaly pattern of coloration. However, for a thrush it has an unusually wide band of bare skin around each eye. It is endemic to the Lesser Antilles, an island group in the Caribbean. It can be found, though uncommon to rare, on Dominica, Guadeloupe, Montserrat, and Saint Lucia. Its natural habitat is tropical moist mountain forest.

Two subspecies occur: the Montserrat race and the Dominica race, distinguished by the amount of scaling on the breast. The Dominica race has a white belly and scaled breast, the Montserrat race has scaling all the way from the breast through the upper belly.

It is threatened by habitat loss.

References

forest thrush
Birds of the Lesser Antilles
Birds of Dominica
Birds of Guadeloupe
Birds of Montserrat
Birds of Saint Lucia
forest thrush
Taxonomy articles created by Polbot